Michael R. White is an American U.S. Navy veteran from Imperial Beach, California. In July 2018, Iranian authorities arrested him while he was visiting his girlfriend in Iran. News of his detention was first reported by IranWire in January 2019 and confirmed by The New York Times.

In March 2019, the Iranian judiciary sentenced White to ten years in prison based on two charges: "insulting the country's top leader and posting a private photograph publicly."

On March 19, 2020, he was released under a medical furlough on humanitarian grounds to the custody of the Swiss Embassy, conditioned upon him staying in Iran.

White had been held in Vakilabad Prison in the city of Mashhad.

The news of Michael White's imprisonment in Iran was first revealed by a former political prisoner named Ivar Farhadi, who had been imprisoned in Mashhad Central Prison for some time and had seen Michael White there.

Release
In June 2020, right after the U.S. had released Sirous Asgari to Iran, White left his house arrest in Iran for Switzerland.

White appeared on the first day of the 2020 Republican National Convention with Donald Trump.

See also
List of foreign nationals detained in Iran

References

Year of birth missing (living people)
Living people
People from Imperial Beach, California
United States Navy sailors
American people imprisoned in Iran